was one of the three main kabuki theatres of Edo alongside the Morita-za and Ichimura-za.

History 
It was founded in 1624 by Nakamura Kanzaburō 1st. The Nakamura-za relocated to the new capital Tokyo in 1868 and reopened under Nakamura Kanzaburō I's last direct descendant Nakamura Kanzaburo XIII (1828–1895) as zamoto.  It was later also called the Miyako-za.

A real-size replica of the Nakamura-za is located at the Edo-Tokyo Museum.

References

External links 

Nakamura-za at Kabuki21.com

Former kabuki theatres
Nihonbashi, Tokyo